Billy (William) Flynn Gadbois (born 17 March 1980, in Worcester, Massachusetts) is an American lawyer and model. He came to limelight in 2017 following a post he made on his Facebook handle which showed him and his two sons cooking to celebrate his divorced wife with whom he had the two kids.

Life and career 
Born to William and Laurie Gadbois, Billy Gadbois is the oldest of six siblings. After finishing high school, he worked as a carpenter at Masters Touch Design Build Company in Metro Boston where he rose to position of vice president/COO. He left the company in 2010 for Boston University School of Law where he studied for his Juris Doctor (JD) and University College London for a Post-Graduate in law. Gadbois is a member of Connecticut and Massachusetts Bar. His law practice focuses on fashion and entertainment industry. He was an associate at Gunderson Dettmer Private Equity and later as an In-House Counsel at Meketa Investment Group.

In 2017, he wrote on Facebook celebrating the birthday of his divorced wife with whom he has two sons who live with their mother. In the post, Gadbois wrote about how he gives their two sons money to shop for gift items and food stuff and joins them in the house where they live with their mother to cook for her birthday celebration. The post went viral generating emotional reactions as to why a divorced couple would celebrate each other. Gadbois responded by saying that the example he set for the “two little men” he is raising on how he treats their mum will shape how they see women and treat them.

References 

Living people
1980 births
American lawyers
Massachusetts lawyers
Connecticut lawyers
Boston University School of Law alumni
American chief operating officers